The Debrecen Award for Molecular Medicine was established in 2003. With the award the Faculty of Medicine of the University of Debrecen, Hungary aims to recognize extraordinary achievements in the field of biomedicine. Nominees are expected to have made great strides in life sciences leading to remarkable progress in our understanding and more efficient treatment of diseases.  The prize amount is set at 10,000 Euros. Each year the decision is reached by secret ballot with all professors of the Faculty of Medicine (University of Debrecen) having the right to participate in the voting.

Award winners
2022 Alexander J. Varshavsky
2021 Katalin Karikó
2019 Valina L. Dawson
2018 Sir David Philip Lane
2017 Franz-Ulrich Hartl
2016 Michael N. Hall
2015 Carl June
2014 Sir Stephen O'Rahilly 
2013 Donald M. Bers 
2012 Shigekazu Nagata 
2011 Sir Salvador Moncada
2010 Yosef Yarden
2009 Axel Ullrich
2008 Bruce M. Spiegelman
2007 Alain Fischer
2006 Ralph M. Steinman
2005 Thomas A. Waldmann
2004 Sir Philip Cohen
2003 J. Craig Venter

See also

 List of biomedical science awards

References

 Valina L. Dawson received the 2019 Debrecen Award for Molecular Medicine
 2018 recipient of the Debrecen Award for Molecular Medicine
Sir David Philip Lane received the 2018 Debrecen Award for Molecular Medicine

Hungarian awards
Biomedical awards
Awards established in 2003
Faculty awards